The following is a list of squads for each national team competing at the 2018 AFC Women's Futsal Championship. The tournament will take place during May 2018 in Thailand. It will be the 2nd competition organised by the Asian Football Confederation (AFC) for the women's national teams of Asia.

Each team must register a squad of 14 players, minimum two of whom must be goalkeepers. The full squad listings are below.

Group A

Thailand
Head coach: Udom Taveesuk

The final squad was named on 25 April 2018.

Hong Kong
Head coach: Ho Wing Kam

Indonesia
Head coach:  Kensuke Takahashi

The final squad was named on 28 April 2018.

Macau
Head coach: Chiang Ka Chon

Group B

Malaysia
Head coach: Addie Azwan

The final squad was named on 30 April 2018.

Vietnam
Head coach: Trương Quốc Tuấn

The final squad was named on 27 April 2018.

Chinese Taipei
Head coach: Chang Yao-ming

The final squad was named on 24 April 2018.

Bangladesh
Head coach: Golam Robbani Choton

The final squad was named on 29 April 2018.

Group C

Japan
Head coach: Kenichiro Kogure

The final squad was named on 16 April 2018.

China PR
Head coach: Hu Jie

Bahrain
Head coach: Elrashid Bukhari Ahmed

Lebanon
Head coach: Maroun El-Khoury

The final squad was named on 23 April 2018.

Group D

Iran
Head coach: Shahrzad Mozaffar

The final squad was named on 22 April 2018.

Uzbekistan
Head coach: Avaz Maksumov

The final squad was named on 25 April 2018.

Turkmenistan
Head coach: Kamil Mingazow

The final squad was named on 30 April 2018.

References

AFC Women's Futsal Championship
Futsal tournament squads